The white-naped monarch (Carterornis pileatus) is a species of bird in the family Monarchidae. It is endemic to Indonesia, where it occurs in the Maluku Islands. Its natural habitat is subtropical or tropical moist lowland forests.

Taxonomy and systematics
This species was formerly placed in the genus Monarcha until moved to Carterornis in 2009. Some authorities have considered the white-naped monarch to be a subspecies of the white-eared monarch.

Subspecies
There are two subspecies recognized:
 Carterornis pileatus pileatus - (Salvadori, 1878): Found on Halmahera
 Carterornis pileatus buruensis - (Meyer, AB, 1884): Originally considered as a separate species in the genus Monarcha. Found on Buru.
The Tanimbar monarch (C. castus), found on the Tanimbar Islands, was originally described as a separate species in the genus Monarcha, reclassified as a subspecies of C. pileatus, and again reclassified as a distinct species within Carterornis by the International Ornithological Congress in 2021.

References

white-naped monarch
Birds of the Maluku Islands
white-naped monarch
Taxonomy articles created by Polbot